Thomas Knight Slater (born on December 26, 1938), known professionally as Michael Hawkins and credited sometimes as Michael D. Gainsborough, is a retired American actor. He is known for playing Frank Ryan on the soap opera Ryan's Hope (1975–1976). He is the father of actor Christian Slater.

Life and career
Hawkins was born Thomas Knight Slater in Queens, New York, the son of Helen Margaret (Knight) and Thomas G. Slater. He would later also use the stage name Michael Gainsborough. His uncle was radio personality Bill Slater.

He spent the early part of his childhood in Forest Hills section of Queens, as well as in Texas and Tennessee. Later in the 1940s, he lived in the Strathmore section of Manhasset, Long Island. He was athletic and was one of the faster boys at his grade school, Munsey Park School, and started his acting and singing career in a fourth-grade production of the Gilbert Sullivan operetta, HMS Pinafore, as Captain Corcoran. His family left Manhasset in 1950. It is not clear where he was raised after that point.
After a small role on the CBS soap opera Search for Tomorrow, he played Dr. Paul Stewart #4 on another CBS soap opera, As the World Turns. He later replaced David Birney as Mark Elliott on another CBS show, Love is a Many Splendored Thing.  He later played Larry Kirby #2 on the NBC soap opera How to Survive a Marriage.

He later created the role of Frank Ryan on the ABC soap opera Ryan's Hope but was fired from the role at the end of the show's first year reportedly due to his alcoholism and inability to memorize lines correctly. He was asked back, but replaced with actor Andrew Robinson later that year. At the time she was cast in Ryan's Hope, Helen Gallagher, who played matriarch Maeve Ryan, taught singing in her home three times a week. Hawkins was one of her students.

Hawkins was married to casting director Mary Jo Slater until their divorce in 1976; their only child is actor Christian Slater.

Filmography

References

External links

1938 births
Male actors from New York (state)
People from Queens, New York
American male film actors
American male soap opera actors
American male television actors
Living people
People from Manhasset, New York